The Xinhai Revolution in Xinjiang refers to the fightings of the members of Anti-Manchu Revolutionary Party (反清革命党人) in Xinjiang during the Xinhai Revolution. The Revolution mainly took place in Yili.

Background
The Han Gelaohui had infiltrated the Qing military in Xinjiang during the Dungan revolt (1895–1896) and allegedly planned to help the Hui rebels before the Hui rebels were crushed.

After the success of the Wuchang Uprising, responses came from all over China, in November 1911, twenty four provinces of the country broke away from the Qing government. Seeing this situation, the Royalist Party of Qing Dynasty conspired to welcome the Xuantong Emperor to move westward, in an attempt to build the capital in Kulun (now Ulaanbaatar of Mongolia) or Altay to cede the northwest, and continue to confront the revolutionary army. When the members of Revolutionary Party in Wuhan learned of this situation, they immediately told their members in Xinjiang, and on November 28, 1911, the Xinhai Revolution broke out in Xinjiang.

Fighting 
The last Gansu Xinjiang Provincial Governor (甘肃新疆巡抚) of Qing Yuan Dahua (袁大化) fled and handed over his resignation to Yang Zengxin, because of the resistance and struggle of the people of all ethnic groups in the north and south of the Tianshan Mountains, 
Yuan "cannot deal with the revolutionaries, hears the wind and loses gall" (穷于应付, 闻风丧胆), and finally had to "flee into the Shanhai Pass", on the other hand, he did not want to work for the Republic of China. The Ili revolutionaries and the Gelaohui were then suppressed by Yang. Yang appointed Ma Fuxing as military commander of 2,000 Chinese Muslim troops, to crush Yang's rivals. President Yuan Shikai recognized his rule, appointing him Provincial Governor of Xinjiang. The revolutionaries printed new multi-lingual media.

Modern evaluation
Some Chinese historians believe that the success of the Xinhai Revolution in Xinjiang (Yili) completely broke the Qing Emperor's plan of moving westward, and directly promoted the abdication of Xuantong Emperor, which has not yet received much attention in the field of Chinese historiography. The Revolution eradicated the last "life-saving straw" ("救命稻草") of the Qing Dynasty.

See also
History of the Republic of China
Military of the Republic of China
History of China
Xinhai Lhasa Turmoil
National Revolutionary Army
Kuomintang
Taishō period
Russian Revolution
German Revolution of 1918–19

References 

1911 Revolution
20th century in Xinjiang
1911 in China
1912 in China